Vion Pharmaceuticals, Inc. was a New Haven, Connecticut based pharmaceutical company founded in March 1992 to commercialize several discoveries made in the biomedical laboratories at Yale University.

Clinical development
Two anticancer agents, Onrigin (laromustine), formerly cloretazine (VNP40101M), and Triapine, a ribunucloetide reductase inhibitor similar to hydroxyurea, were in human clinical trials. A novel alkylating agent, Onrigin was evaluated in a Phase 2 trial in elderly de novo poor-risk acute myeloid leukemia (AML). In addition, several trials of Onrigin were conducted in elderly patients with AML and myelodysplastic syndrome (MDS) in combination with cytarabine, and in patients with brain tumors in combination with temozolomide.

Bankruptcy

After Onrigin was rejected by the Food and Drug Administration for an AML indication in 2009 due to an unfavorable risk-benefit profile, the company became defunct. The company declared bankruptcy in December 2009.

References

Companies based in New Haven, Connecticut
Health care companies based in Connecticut
Defunct companies based in Connecticut
Defunct pharmaceutical companies of the United States
Pharmaceutical companies established in 1992
Pharmaceutical companies disestablished in 2009
Companies that filed for Chapter 11 bankruptcy in 2009